Heinz Günthardt and Balázs Taróczy were the defending champions, but lost in the first round to Sammy Giammalva and Greg Holmes.

Joakim Nyström and Mats Wilander defeated Gary Donnelly and Peter Fleming in the final, 7–6(7–4), 6–3, 6–3 to win the gentlemen's doubles title at the 1986 Wimbledon Championships.

Seeds

  Stefan Edberg /  Anders Järryd (first round)
  Ken Flach /  Robert Seguso (quarterfinals)
  John Fitzgerald /  Tomáš Šmíd (second round)
  Hans Gildemeister /  Andrés Gómez (first round)
  Scott Davis /  David Pate (first round)
  Paul Annacone /  Christo van Rensburg (semifinals)
  Joakim Nyström /  Mats Wilander (champions)
  Heinz Günthardt /  Balázs Taróczy (first round)
  Wojciech Fibak /  Guy Forget (third round)
  Sergio Casal /  Emilio Sánchez (quarterfinals)
  Peter McNamara /  Paul McNamee (third round)
  Gary Donnelly /  Peter Fleming (final)
  Mark Edmondson /  Kim Warwick (first round)
  Henri Leconte /  Sherwood Stewart (first round)
  Pat Cash /  Kevin Curren (third round)
  Jakob Hlasek /  Pavel Složil (semifinals)

Draw

Finals

Top half

Section 1

Section 2

Bottom half

Section 3

Section 4

References

External links

1986 Wimbledon Championships – Men's draws and results at the International Tennis Federation

Men's Doubles
Wimbledon Championship by year – Men's doubles